Kevin Schwantz (born June 19, 1964) is an American former professional motorcycle road racer. He was the world champion of the 1993 FIM Road Racing World Championship.

Early life
Schwantz, whose parents owned a motorcycle shop, learned to ride at the age of four. He began his competitive career as a trials rider, following his father and Uncle, Darryl Hurst (the original 34), in that sport. From trials, he progressed to motocross in his teens, becoming a top regional MX racer. After a serious crash in qualifying for the Houston Supercross in 1983, he decided to quit motocross.

Career
At the end of the 1984 season, he was offered a test ride with the Yoshimura Suzuki Superbike team, who promptly signed the Texan to a contract. In his first race for Yoshimura, he won both legs of the 1985 Willow Springs AMA Superbike National. He finished seventh overall in the championship despite only competing in half the races. He finished second to Eddie Lawson in the 1986 Daytona 200 on the new Suzuki GSX-R750. Then, in what would become an all too common occurrence throughout his career, he broke his collarbone in a qualifying crash and missed several races. Once again he finished seventh overall in the Championship.

The 1987 Superbike National Championship marked the beginning of Schwantz' fiercely competitive rivalry with Wayne Rainey. The two battled throughout the entire season, often coming into contact on the track. Rainey eventually won the National Championship but Schwantz closed the season winning five out of six races. So intense was their rivalry that they continued their battle during the 1987 Transatlantic Trophy match races in which they were supposedly teammates competing against a team of British riders.

Schwantz began 1988 by winning the season-opening Daytona 200 in what would be his only win in that prestigious event. He then departed for Europe as Suzuki promoted him to its 500cc Grand Prix team where he made an immediate impact by winning the 1988 Japanese Grand Prix in the opening round at Suzuka, Japan; it was only his seventh Grand Prix ride in total, having experienced wild card rides in 1986 on the old square four RG500 and in 1987 on the first version of the V4 RGV500.

His archrival, Rainey joined the Grand Prix circuit, signing for the Team Roberts-Yamaha squad. For the next six years, the two continued their intense rivalry on race tracks all across Europe.

The late 1980s and early 1990s are remembered as one of the most competitive eras of Grand Prix racing with a field rich in talent that included Rainey, Wayne Gardner, Mick Doohan, Eddie Lawson and Randy Mamola. He was often at a disadvantage in that his Suzukis never seemed to be as fast as those of his Yamaha and Honda mounted rivals. His determination to win at all cost meant that he seemed to crash as often as he won. This trait made him a popular favorite among race fans the world over. His last lap pass of Rainey to win the 1991 German Grand Prix at the Hockenheimring, with his rear tire fish-tailing on the verge of control, typified Schwantz' "do or die" riding style.

He culminated his career in 1993 by winning his only 500cc World Championship. After suffering through a crash-infested 1994 season, the injuries he had incurred over the years began to take their toll on him, as did the career ending injuries suffered by his rival Rainey, at the 1993 Italian Grand Prix that left him paralyzed from the chest down. Early in the 1995 season, after a conversation with Rainey, Schwantz decided to retire from motorcycle competition. Schwantz had accumulated 25 Grands Prix wins during his career, one more than his great rival, Wayne Rainey. This made him the second most successful American roadracer behind Eddie Lawson. In a display of respect, the FIM retired his racing number (34) as a testament to his popularity.

In the late 1990s, Schwantz ran a couple of seasons of the Australian NASCAR Championship before returning home to the United States where he competed in the NASCAR Busch Series, running 18 races with two top tens, an ARCA Bondo/Mar-Hyde Series event, and touring car races. Schwantz was inducted into the AMA Motorcycle Hall of Fame in 1999. The FIM named him a Grand Prix "Legend" in 2000.

Schwantz co-designed the Circuit of the Americas racetrack with Tavo Hellmund and German architect and circuit designer Hermann Tilke.

Schwantz has operated a riding school since circa 2001 in Birmingham, Alabama.

Other appearances
In 2003, he was featured in the motorcycle racing documentary film Faster.

In 2011, he rode Marco Simoncelli's bike in his honor in Valencia, Spain.

In 2017, he made a guest appearance on Jay Leno's Garage (Season 3, Episode 10).

Awards
He was inducted into the Motorsports Hall of Fame of America in 2019.

Career Statistics

Grand Prix motorcycle racing
Source:

Points system from 1968 to 1987

Points system from 1988 to 1992

Points system from 1993 onwards.

By season

By class

Races by year
(key) (Races in bold indicate pole position, races in italics indicate fastest lap)

NASCAR
(key) (Bold – Pole position awarded by qualifying time. Italics – Pole position earned by points standings or practice time. * – Most laps led.)

Busch Series

References

External links

 Kevin-Schwantz.com - Official site
 Kevin Schwantz School
 
 

1964 births
Living people
People from Houston
American people of German descent
American motorcycle racers
500cc World Championship riders
AMA Superbike Championship riders
Motorcycle trainers
NASCAR drivers
ARCA Menards Series drivers
Racing drivers from Houston
Racing drivers from Texas
500cc World Riders' Champions